Pillow Queens are an Irish indie rock band from Dublin, formed in 2016. The band is composed of co-lead vocalists Sarah Corcoran and Pamela Connolly, lead guitarist Cathy McGuiness and drummer Rachel Lyons. The instrumental roles of Corcoran and Connolly switch around depending on which of them is performing lead vocals – if a song features Corcoran on lead vocals, for example, then she will play rhythm guitar and Connolly will play bass, and vice versa for Connolly's songs.

The band have been praised for their lyrical content, which often reckons with an Irish Catholic upbringing mixed with the band members themselves being openly LGBT. NME noted that the band "explore the intersection of religion and queerness", while The Guardian noted that the band "acknowledges the psychological challenge of adapting to even positive social change after a lifetime conditioned in its opposite".

The band released their debut album, In Waiting, in 2020. It received critical acclaim, with The Irish Times deeming it "an emotional masterpiece". A second LP, Leave the Light On, was released in April 2022.

History

Pillow Queens was started by Sarah Corcoran and Pamela Connolly. After leaving their previous bands, the two wanted to go further with their new band, which they decided would consist of four queer women. They were then joined by Cathy McGuinness and Rachel Lyons, who they had known for years. In late 2016, the group released their first demo EP entitled Calm Girls. The release of this record was followed by performances on the Irish festival circuit, including at Electric Picnic and All Together Now. After the release of their second EP, State of the State, the group performed with the likes of Pussy Riot, Future Islands, Idles and performed in the IMRO room at Other Voices.
 
In a mid-2019 interview with RTÉ, the band stated that they were in the studio working on their debut LP, tentatively due to be released in mid-2020. On 1 November 2019, Pillow Queens released the single "Brothers", and the accompanying "Brothers (Acoustic)". The band played two further songs from their upcoming album, "Child of Prague" and "Liffey", on 9 November 2019, during a set in Reykjavík as part of Iceland Airwaves 2019.

In 2020, their single Gay Girls featured on the soundtrack to the Amazon Original Irish film Dating Amber. That year, the band also were part of "Irish Women in Harmony", an Irish collective of female singers and musicians that recorded a version of Dreams in aid of the charity SafeIreland, which deals with domestic abuse which had reportedly risen significantly during the COVID-19 lockdown.

The band announced on 10 February 2021 that they had signed to the record label Sub Pop's publishing arm and confirmed in August of that year they had begun recording their second LP. The following month, the band released a new single, a re-recorded version of the song "Rats" from their Calm Girls EP. The band also simultaneously signed to Royal Mountain Records.

In January 2022, the band announced their second studio album Leave the Light On. Its lead single, "Be By Your Side", was released the same day. A second single, "Hearts & Minds", followed in February. The album was released on April 1, 2022.

Style

The band has both pop and punk influences; however, they have been hesitant to define their work as either, in order to avoid being labeled.

Pillow Queens have been described by Paste magazine as having a "sonic palette" crossed with "ragged-edged" guitars, combined with "smooth harmonies".

Members

 Sarah Corcoran – lead and backing vocals, rhythm guitar, bass
 Rachel Lyons − drums, backing vocals
 Cathy McGuinness − lead guitar, backing vocals
 Pamela Connolly – lead and backing vocals, rhythm guitar, bass

Discography

Studio albums

Extended plays

Singles

References

External links

Irish rock music groups
Irish indie rock groups
Irish alternative rock groups
Musical groups from Dublin (city)
Musical groups established in 2016
All-female bands
Specialist Subject Records artists
LGBT-themed musical groups
2016 establishments in Ireland